Valeriy Haidarzhi (born December 17, 1986) is a Ukrainian footballer who plays as a midfielder.

Career 
Haidarzhi began his career in 2003 in the Ukrainian Second League with FC Chornomorets-2 Odesa. In 2004, he remained in the Second League by signing with FC Podillya Khmelnytskyi. He later played with FC Bastion Illichivsk, and FC Krystal Kherson. In 2015, he played in the Ukrainian Football Amateur League with FC Zhemchuzhyna Odesa.

He went abroad in 2017 to sign with FC Vorkuta in the Canadian Soccer League. Throughout the season he assisted in securing the First Division title. In his second season with Vorkuta he assisted in securing the CSL Championship. In 2019, he assisted in securing Vorkuta's second First Division title.

Honors 
FC Vorkuta
 CSL Championship: 2018
 Canadian Soccer League First Division: 2017, 2019

References 

1986 births
Living people
Ukrainian footballers
FC Chornomorets-2 Odesa players
FC Podillya Khmelnytskyi players
FC Bastion Illichivsk players
FC Krystal Kherson players
FC Zhemchuzhyna Odesa players
FC Continentals players
Canadian Soccer League (1998–present) players
Association football midfielders
Ukrainian First League players
Ukrainian expatriate footballers
Ukrainian expatriate sportspeople in Canada
Expatriate soccer players in Canada
Ukrainian Second League players
People from Artsyz
Sportspeople from Odesa Oblast